René Spicher (born 6 March 1963) is a retired Swiss footballer who played in the late 1980s and early 1990s. He played as defender or as midfielder. 

Spicher first played two seasons with BSC Old Boys in the Nationalliga B, the second tier of Swiss football. In both seasons he played regularly in the teams starting 11.

Spicher then joined FC Basel's first team for their 1989–90 season under head-coach Urs Siegenthaler, also in the second tier of Swiss football. After playing in two test matches, Spicher played his domestic league debut for his new club in the home game at the St. Jakob Stadium on 22 July 1989 as Basel won 2–0 against his old club Old Boys. Spicher scored his first goal for his club on 23 August in the away game as Basel played a 2–2 draw with Chênois.

He stayed with the club only this one season and during this time Spicher played a total of 12 games for Basel scoring that one goal. 8 of these games were in the Nationalliga A, two in the Swiss Cup and two were friendly games.

References

Sources
 Die ersten 125 Jahre. Publisher: Josef Zindel im Friedrich Reinhardt Verlag, Basel. 
 Verein "Basler Fussballarchiv" Homepage

BSC Old Boys players
FC Basel players
Swiss men's footballers
Association football defenders
Association football midfielders
1963 births
Living people
Swiss Challenge League players